Metrovías S.A. is an Argentine privately owned company that operates the Buenos Aires Underground and the Metropolitan services of the Urquiza Line. 90% of Metrovías' shares are held by Grupo Roggio.

History
On 1 January 1994, Metrovías took over the concession, granted by the Argentine government as part of railway privatisation during the presidency of Carlos Menem, for the operation of the standard gauge Urquiza Line commuter rail service in Buenos Aires, Argentina. The Metrovías consortium comprised Burlington Northern, Morrison-Knudsen and two Argentinian companies. This service had previously been run by the state-owned Ferrocarriles Argentinos as part of the General Urquiza Railway since the nationalisation of the railways in 1948. In addition Metrovías took over the management of the Buenos Aires Underground system and the Buenos Aires PreMetro when they were privatised in 1994.

The Urquiza Line operates from Federico Lacroze railway station to General Lemos and, when combined with the Underground, have a total of 108 stations, 72.9 kilometres of track, with 692 carriages that transport 283.8 million passengers per year. The company has approximately 3,000 employees.

From 2004 to 2013 the company also formed part of UGOFE, a consortium with Trenes de Buenos Aires and Ferrovías, which took over the running of commuter rail services on the Belgrano Sur Line, Roca Line and San Martín Line after concessions granted to Metropolitano S.A. for the operation of these services were revoked.

See also
 Buenos Aires Underground
 Urquiza Line
 Buenos Aires PreMetro

References

External links
 Official site

Burlington Northern Railroad
Buenos Aires Underground
Railway companies established in 1994
Railway companies of Argentina
1994 establishments in Argentina
Rail transport in Buenos Aires Province